Troublesome Creek could mean:
 Troublesome Creek (Hess Creek), a creek in Yukon–Koyukuk Census Area, Alaska
 Troublesome Creek (Colorado River), a stream in Colorado
 Troublesome Creek (Long Creek tributary), a stream in Georgia
 Troublesome Creek (Towaliga River tributary), a stream in Georgia
 Troublesome Creek (North Fork Kentucky River), a creek in Kentucky
 Troublesome Creek (Missouri), a creek in Missouri
 Troublesome Creek (Haw River tributary), a stream in North Carolina
 Troublesome Creek (Clinch River), a creek in Virginia
 Troublesome Creek: A Midwestern, a 1995 documentary film